The 2007–08 Valparaiso Crusaders men's basketball team was an NCAA Division I college basketball team competing in the Horizon League.

Coaching staff
 Homer Drew – Head coach
 Bryce Drew – Associate head coach
 Luke Gore – Assistant coach
 Chris Sparks – Assistant coach
 Tarrance Price – Director of Basketball Operations

Preseason
During the off-season, the Crusaders joined the Horizon League after previously competing in the Mid-Continent Conference.

Awards

Horizon League Player of the Week
Samuel Haanpää, week ending December 16

Roster

Schedule

References

Valparaiso Crusaders
Valparaiso Beacons men's basketball seasons
Valparaiso
Valp
Valp